Rashvanlu may refer to:
 Rashvanlu, Bojnord
 Rashvanlu, Faruj
 Rashvanlu, Shirvan